Majjige huli is an Indian dish native to Karnataka prepared with sour curd/ buttermilk curd. It typically includes vegetables in a buttermilk gravy.  Majjige huli is a traditional Sankranti food.

References

Indian cuisine
Karnataka cuisine